is a Japanese politician of the Liberal Democratic Party, a member of the House of Councillors in the Diet (national legislature). A native of Sendai, Miyagi and graduate of Chuo University, he was elected for the first time in 2001. He is affiliated to the revisionist lobby Nippon Kaigi.

References

External links 
 Official website in Japanese.

Members of the House of Councillors (Japan)
Chuo University alumni
People from Sendai
Living people
1969 births
Members of Nippon Kaigi
Liberal Democratic Party (Japan) politicians